The 4th Metro Manila Film Festival had its run in 1978 starting from December 25 onwards. There were nine official entries and Atsay was hailed as the Festival's Best Film.

Ian Film Productions' Atsay received the most awards, with a total of four including Best Picture Award in the highly contested 1978 Metro Manila Film Festival. The movie also won for Nora Aunor the Best Performer Award, the first and only awardee of the category. Sampaguita Pictures' Rubia Servios received two awards: Best Screenplay for Mario O'Hara and Best Editing for Jose Tarnate. RVQ's Jack n' Jill of the Third Kind was the top grosser of the festival.

Entries

Awards
Winners are listed first and highlighted in boldface.

Multiple awards

Ceremony Information

"Noranians" versus "Vilmanians"
The board of jurors decided to not award honors for Best Actor, Best Actress, Best Supporting Actor and Best Supporting Actress for some reasons. Instead, the jurors gave Nora Aunor a "Best Performer" award for her role in the movie Atsay. Ms. Aunor beat Ms. Santos, whom fortune-tellers on the talk show of Inday Badiday had predicted would win the award for her role in the movie Rubia Servios.

Atsay vs. Rubia Servios commentary
In 1979, Isagani Cruz of TV Times commented about Atsay and Rubia Servios. He states: "Rubia Servios is Lino Brocka's film; Atsay is Eddie Garcia's. Nora does an excellent acting job; but so does Vilma Santos, and Rubia is a much more demanding and difficult role. Edgardo M. Reyes is an established literary figure, but Mario O'Hara is much better screenwriter. Overall, Atsay may be much more impressive than Rubia Servios. In terms of challenging our moral and legal convictions, however, Rubia Servios is much more significant."

References

External links
Metro Manila Film Festival: Awards for 1975 at the Internet Movie Database

Metro Manila Film Festival
MMFF
MMFF